The Irons (Iron dialect: Ирон - Iron, pl.: Ирæттæ, Ирон адæм - Irættæ, Iron adæm) are a subgroup of the Ossetians. They speak the Iron dialect of the Eastern Iranian Ossetian language. The majority of Irons profess Russian Orthodoxy. While the Uatsdin faith has also been preserved by a minority of Irons, and a small minority of Irons also profess Sunni Islam, mainly in the lowland villages of North Ossetia.

See also 
 Ossetians
 North Ossetia–Alania
 Iron (dialect)

References

Ethnic groups in Russia
Ossetian people